Nathan Mullock Hallock (August 23, 1844 - March 21, 1903) was a Union Army soldier in the American Civil War who received the U.S. military's highest decoration, the Medal of Honor.

Hallock was born in Mount Hope, New York on August 23, 1844. He was awarded the Medal of Honor, for extraordinary heroism shown on June 15, 1863, while serving as a Private with Company K, 124th New York Volunteer Infantry Regiment, at Bristoe Station, Virginia. His Medal of Honor was issued on September 10, 1897.

Hallock died at the age of 58, on March 21, 1903 and was buried at Hillside Cemetery in Middletown, Orange County, New York.

Medal of Honor citation

See also
124th New York Volunteer Infantry Regiment

Notes

References

External links

1844 births
1903 deaths
People from Mount Hope, New York
People of New York (state) in the American Civil War
Union Army soldiers
United States Army Medal of Honor recipients
American Civil War recipients of the Medal of Honor